Grey Eagle Township is a township in Todd County, Minnesota, United States. The population was 663 according to a 2000 census.

Grey Eagle Township was organized in 1873, and named for the fact a pioneer hunter had shot an eagle there.

Geography

Demographics
As of the census of 2000, there were 663 people, 257 households, and 205 families residing in the township. There were 576 housing units at an average density of 23.0/sq mi (8.9/km2). The racial makeup of the township was 99.85% White and 0.15% Asian.

There were 257 households, out of which 27.6% had children under the age of 18 living with them, 72.4% were married couples living together, 4.3% had a female householder with no husband present, and 20.2% were non-families. 19.5% of all households were made up of individuals, and 9.3% had someone living alone who was 65 years of age or older.  The average household size was 2.58 and the average family size was 2.93.

In the township the population was spread out, with 24.3% under the age of 18, 4.8% from 18 to 24, 22.9% from 25 to 44, 27.3% from 45 to 64, and 20.7% who were 65 years of age or older.  The median age was 43 years. For every 100 females, there were 101.5 males.  For every 100 females age 18 and over, there were 105.7 males.

The median income for a household in the township was $41,923, and the median income for a family was $47,778. Males had a median income of $28,833 versus $19,853 for females. The per capita income for the township was $20,151.  About 5.0% of families and 8.8% of the population were below the poverty line, including 14.2% of those under age 18 and 4.8% of those age 65 or over.

References

Townships in Todd County, Minnesota
Townships in Minnesota